The Battle of Tranter's Creek was fought on June 5, 1862, in Pitt County, North Carolina, as part of Union Maj. Gen. Ambrose E. Burnside's North Carolina expedition during the American Civil War.

On June 5, Col. Robert Potter, garrison commander at Washington, North Carolina, ordered a reconnaissance in the direction of Pactolus. The 24th Massachusetts, under Lt. Col. F. A. Osborne, advanced to the bridge over Tranter's Creek, where it encountered the 44th North Carolina, under Col. George Singletary. Unable to force a crossing, Osborne fired his artillery (Companies A–G, 1st New York Marine Artillery) at the mill buildings in which the Confederates were barricaded. Singletary was killed in the bombardment, and his troops retreated. The Federals did not pursue and returned to their fortifications at Washington.

Gallery

References
National Park Service battle description
 CWSAC Report Update

Burnside's North Carolina Expedition
Battles of the Eastern Theater of the American Civil War
Union victories of the American Civil War
Tranter's Creek
1862 in the United States
1862 in the American Civil War
1862 in North Carolina
June 1862 events